Doug Funderburk (born May 17, 1956) is a Republican former member of the Missouri House of Representatives.  He represented part of St. Charles County, in the 12th and 103rd districts, from 2007 to 2015.

Early life and career
Doug Funderburk was born 1956 in Cameroon and received a degree in Instrumentation and Process Controls Technology from Ranken Technical College.  He has worked for Boeing since 1982 and has been a member of the International Brotherhood of Electrical Workers Local #1 for 25 years.  He is an active leader in the Boy Scouts of America, has a wife, two children, and attends the Church of the Rock.

Political career
Doug Funderburk was elected to the St. Charles County Council in 1996 and served on the council until 2006.  He spent seven years in the leadership of that body, including four years as chairman.  In 2006, Funderburk was elected to the Missouri House of Representatives.  He was then reelected in both 2008 and 2010.  He served on the board of the Missouri Association of Counties.  As a state representative he was one of only 39 state legislators to sign a 'no new taxes' pledge.

Committee assignments
Joint Legislative Committee on Court Automation
Elementary and Secondary Education
Utilities (Chairman)
Economic Development
Special Standing Committee on Emerging Issues in Health Care

Electoral history

References

External links
 Official Missouri House of Representatives profile
 Interest Group Ratings
 Campaign Finance Information

Republican Party members of the Missouri House of Representatives
Living people
1956 births
People from St. Peters, Missouri